The Suleja–Minna Road is a 40 km carriageway connecting Abuja and Niger State. The road generally links the North-West part of Nigeria to Abuja. On 11 February 2015, the Federal Government of Nigeria under the Goodluck Jonathan administration kicked off the dualization of the Suleja-Minna road after several efforts by past administrations to redevelop it stalled.

References

Transport in Abuja
Transport in Niger State